Lecidella is a genus of crustose lichens in the family Lecanoraceae.

Taxonomy
Lecidella was circumscribed by German lichenologist Gustav Wilhelm Körber in 1855. It was not widely used until more than a century later, when Hannes Hertel recognized it first as a subgenus of Lecidea, and then a couple of year after as a distinct genus.

A phylogenetic analysis of the genus using 11 species (mostly from China) found that Lecidella species fall into three major clades, which were proposed as three informal groups: Lecidella stigmatea group, L. elaeochroma group and L. enteroleucella group.

Description
Lecidella species have a thallus that is crustose, and biatorine, meaning that it resembles the genus Biatora–having a proper exciple, which is not coal-black, but coloured or blackening. It has eight-spored asci of the Lecidella type. The ascospores are simple and hyaline, while the conidia are curved and threadlike.

Morphologically similar genera include Japewiella, Carbonea, and Tasmidella.

Species
Lecidella was estimated to contain about 80 species in a popular 2008 text, a number that was used in a recent (2020) survey of fungal classification. , Species Fungorum accepts 37 species in the genus.

Lecidella aeruginea 
Lecidella anomaloides 
Lecidella asema 
Lecidella aurata 
Lecidella buelliastrum 
Lecidella carpathica 
Lecidella chiricahuana 
Lecidella chodatii 
Lecidella destituta 
Lecidella elaeochroma 
Lecidella enteroleucella 
Lecidella euphorea 
Lecidella flavosorediata 
Lecidella flavovirens 
Lecidella granulosula 
Lecidella greenii 
Lecidella laureri 
Lecidella leucomarginata  – Australia
Lecidella mandshurica  – Asia
Lecidella meiococca 
Lecidella meridionalis  – Australia
Lecidella montana 
Lecidella nashiana 
Lecidella occidentalis 
Lecidella oceanica  – South Korea
Lecidella patavina 
Lecidella pulveracea 
Lecidella scabra 
Lecidella stigmatea 
Lecidella sublapicida 
Lecidella subviridis  – Norway; Sweden
Lecidella varangrica  – Norway
Lecidella viridans 
Lecidella wulfenii 
Lecidella xylogena 
Lecidella yunnanensis  – China

References

Lecanoraceae
Lichen genera
Lecanorales genera
Taxa described in 1855
Taxa named by Gustav Wilhelm Körber